Karnes, Texas, may refer to:
 Karnes City, Texas
 Karnes County, Texas